Hanwha Life Esports (HLE) is a South Korean esports organization based in Seoul, owned by Hanwha Life Insurance. It has teams competing in League of Legends and Kart Rider, with the former competing in the LCK, South Korea's top level professional league for the game.

In middle 2018, HLE acquired the League of Legends team and LCK spot of Tigers. At the 2015 League of Legends World Championship, the team (as KOO Tigers) placed second in their preliminary group before beating KT Rolster and Fnatic in the bracket stage. The team finished as runner-ups after facing SK Telecom T1 in the finals in Berlin, Germany.

The team (as ROX Tigers) won their first LCK title after winning the 2016 Summer League of Legends Champions Korea playoffs. At the 2016 League of Legends World Championship, team finished as third place after lost again to SK Telecom T1 2–3, although leaded the series 2–1.

History

Tigers era

2014 
Tigers was founded in November 2014 by Chinese social networking site YY. YY's parent company Guongzhou Huaduo Network Technology, LLC. (Duowan Inc.) hoped to promote their newly renamed streaming site, HUYA.com, in South Korea by creating a team built around well-known Korean players. The team was registered under Duowan's Korean subsidiary GE Entertainment.

The initial roster, announced under the name HUYA Tigers, included former members of NaJin Sword, NaJin Shield, and Incredible Miracle 1: top laner Smeb, jungler Lee, mid laner KurO, AD carry PraY, and support GorillA comprised the initial lineup, with NoFe as head coach. Shortly after its formation, the team qualified for the League of Legends Champions Korea Spring Qualifiers, placing first in the group stage over Team Avalanche. They went 2–1 in the final stage and qualified for SBENU Champions Spring 2015. In the Champions Spring pre-season, HUYA Tigers finished tied for third place with KT Rolster, each with 7 points. They renamed to GE Tigers at the start of the Spring Season.

2015 
The GE Tigers started out as the top team in Korea in their first season in the LCK, in first place with a 7–0 match record and a 14–2 game record at the end of week 6 of the Spring season. This placement earned them an invitation to the Intel Extreme Masters Season IX – World Championship in March. However, after defeating Cloud9 and SK Gaming to win their group, they lost in the semifinals 2–1 to Team WE – who entered the competition as the 12th-place team in the Chinese League of Legends Pro League (LPL). This led many casters and analysts to label it the biggest upset to date in the entire history of competitive League of Legends. After their return to Korea, the GE Tigers' record worsened, and they dropped sets to both KT Rolster and to SK Telecom T1. They still finished first in the round robin with a 12–2 record, but in the playoffs they lost to SKT and missed out on the 2015 Mid-Season Invitational. Prior to the start of SBENU Champions Summer 2015, the GE Tigers were sponsored by streaming company KooTV and changed their name to the KOO Tigers. KOO ended the regular season of Champions Summer in 4th place. They beat NaJin e-mFire 2–1 and CJ Entus 3–0 to advance to the semi-finals where they played a close series with KT Rolster but lost 3–2, ultimately ending in third place. Because SKT won the finals, KOO automatically qualified for the 2015 League of Legends World Championship as the second seed from Korea with the most circuit points.

At the World Championship, KOO Tigers finished 2nd in their group with a 4–2 record and advanced to the bracket round. They defeated KT Rolster 3 to 1 in the quarter-finals. On 24 October 2015 they made a clean sweep, 3 to 0, against Fnatic in the semi-finals. The team finished second after losing with a 1–3 record to SK Telecom T1 in the final on 31 October 2015.

KooTV dropped their sponsorship of the team in November, reverting the name to just Tigers. In January 2016, the team once again changed their name, this time to ROX Tigers.

2016 
In the LCK Champions spring season, ROX Tigers finished in 1st, and met SKT T1 in the final. ROX Tigers impressed the world with their domination of Korea and their near perfect play in the regular season. Unfortunately, in final the match against SKT T1, ROX Tigers lost 3–1 finishing the LCK playoffs in 2nd place.
However, ROX Tigers have the honor of boasting the highest team KDA in this season.

Top laner Smeb was named MVP of the spring split and summer split.

HLE era

2018 
In middle 2018, Hanwha Life Insurance acquired the League of Legends team rosters and LCK spot of ROX Tigers. The team also was renamed to Hanwha Life Esports (HLE). They had finished at 6th place of regular summer season and couldn't qualify for Play-off stage.

Roster

Tournament results

As KOO Tigers 
 2nd – 2015 League of Legends World Championship

As ROX Tigers 
 1st – 2016 Spring League of Legends Champions Korea season
 2nd – 2016 Spring League of Legends Champions Korea playoffs
 1st – 2016 Summer League of Legends Champions Korea season
 1st – 2016 Summer League of Legends Champions Korea playoffs
 3rd–4th – 2016 League of Legends World Championship
 1st – 2016 Kespa Cup

Notes

References 

2014 establishments in South Korea
Esports teams based in South Korea
Esports teams established in 2014
League of Legends Champions Korea teams